
Majestic Hotel or Hotel Majestic may refer to:

England
Majestic Hotel, Barrow-in-Furness, Cumbria
Majestic Hotel, Harrogate, North Yorkshire

France
Hotel Majestic (Cannes)
Majestic Hôtel-Spa, a hotel in Paris
The Peninsula Paris, originally the Hotel Majestic

Malaysia
Hotel Majestic (Kuala Lumpur)

Mexico
Hotel Majestic (Mexico City)

Spain
Hotel Majestic (Barcelona)

Tunisia
Hotel Majestic (Tunis)

United States
Majestic Hotel (Atlanta)
Hotel Majestic (Manhattan) (1894–1929), today The Majestic (apartment building)
Majestic Hotel (St. Louis, Missouri)
Hotel Majestic (San Francisco)

Vietnam
Hotel Majestic (Saigon)

Other uses
 Hotel Majestic (TV series), a 2015 Nigerian telenovela
 "Hotel Majestic", the 11th track on the album Traffic and Weather by Fountains of Wayne

See also
 Maigret and the Hotel Majestic, a detective novel
Majestic Building (disambiguation)